The 2002 American League Division Series (ALDS), the opening round of the 2002 American League playoffs, began on Tuesday, October 1, and ended on Sunday, October 6, with the champions of the three AL divisions—along with a "wild card" team—participating in two best-of-five series. The teams were:

(1) New York Yankees (Eastern Division champion, 103–58) vs. (4) Anaheim Angels (Wild Card, 99–63): Angels win series, 3–1.
(2) Oakland Athletics (Western Division champion, 103–59) vs. (3) Minnesota Twins (Central Division champion, 94–67): Twins win series, 3–2.

The first of the 2 Division Series matchups saw the wild card-qualifying Angels pull a shocking upset of the defending league champion Yankees (ending the latter's bid for a fifth consecutive World Series appearance), while the other saw the Twins defeat the heavily-favored Athletics. The Angels and Twins went on to meet in the AL Championship Series (ALCS). The Angels became the American League champion, and defeated the National League champion San Francisco Giants in the 2002 World Series, for their first-ever World title.

Matchups

New York Yankees vs. Anaheim Angels

Oakland Athletics vs. Minnesota Twins

New York vs. Anaheim

Game 1
Yankee Stadium (I) in Bronx, New York

The Yankees struck first in Game 1 on Derek Jeter's home run in the first off Jarrod Washburn, but in the top of the third, Darin Erstad singled off Roger Clemens. Alfonso Soriano then mishandled Jorge Posada's throw to second on Erstad's stolen base attempt, letting Erstad go to third. Tim Salmon then singled to tie the game. Jason Giambi's two-run home run in the fourth after Jeter drew a leadoff walk put the Yankees up 3–1, but the Angels loaded the bases in the fifth with two outs on two walks and a single before Garret Anderson tied the game with a double to left. The Yankees regained the lead in the bottom of the inning on Rondell White's home run, but the Angels again tied the score on Troy Glaus's home run leading off the sixth. Glaus's second home run of the game in the eighth off Ramiro Mendoza put the Angels up 5–4, but in the bottom of the inning, reliever Ben Weber walked two with two outs, Anaheim manager Mike Scioscia brought in Scott Schoeneweis to pitch to Jason Giambi, who tied the game with an RBI single. Scioscia then brought in Brendan Donnelly to face Bernie Williams who hit a three-run homer to put the Yankees up 8–5. Mariano Rivera pitched a scoreless top of the ninth for the save and give the Yankees a 1–0 series lead.

Game 2
Yankee Stadium (I) in Bronx, New York

The Angels struck first in Game 2 on Tim Salmon's two-out home run in the first off Andy Pettitte. Next inning, Scott Spiezio homered with one out off Pettitte, who then allowed three consecutive singles, the last of which Benji Gil scored Shawn Wooten. Next inning, Garret Anderson singled with one out, moved to second on a sacrifice fly, and scored on Spiezio's single. Derek Jeter's home run in the bottom of the inning off Kevin Appier put the Yankees on the board. Next inning, Juan Rivera's two-out two-run single cut the Angels lead to 4–3. In the sixth, Alfonso Soriano's two-run home run off Francisco Rodriguez put the Yankees up 5–4, but back-to-back home runs by Anderson and Troy Glaus leading off the eighth off Orlando Hernandez put the Angels up 6–5. Steve Karsay relieved Hernandez and allowed two one-out singles to put runners on first and third. Adam Kennedy's sacrifice fly off Mike Stanton put the Angels up 7–5. In the ninth, Jeff Weaver allowed two one-out singles before Spiezio's double put the Angels up 8–5. In the bottom of the inning, Troy Percival allowed three singles, the last of which to Jorge Posada scoring Jason Giambi, but earned the save as the Angels tied the series 1–1 going to Anaheim.

Game 3
Edison International Field of Anaheim in Anaheim, California

The Yankees loaded the bases in the first off Ramon Ortiz on a single and two walks before Robin Ventura's double scored two and Jorge Posada's sacrifice fly scored another. The Angels got on the board in the second off Mike Mussina when Troy Glaus singled, moved to third on a double and scored on Scott Spiezio's groundout. Ortiz in the third allowed a leadoff walk and subsequent double before Ventura's sacrifice fly put the Yankees up 4–1. After walking Raul Mondesi with two outs, Ortiz was relieved by John Lackey, who allowed consecutive RBI singles to Nick Johnson and Juan Rivera. The Angels cut the Yankees' lead to 6–3 in the bottom of the inning on Tim Salmon's two-run double after David Eckstein and Darin Erstad singled. Next inning, Adam Kennedy's home run cut the lead to 6–4. In the sixth, Jeff Weaver allowed a leadoff single, subsequent walk, and sacrifice bunt before Kennedy's sacrifice fly made it 6–5 Yankees. Next inning, Spiezio's two-out single with runners on first and second off Mike Stanton tied the game. Next inning, Kennedy hit a leadoff double and scored on Erstad's one-out double. Steve Karsay relieved Stanton and allowed a home run to Salmon to put the Angels up 9–6. Troy Percival retired the Yankees in order in the ninth as the Angels took a 2–1 series lead.

Game 4
Edison International Field of Anaheim in Anaheim, California

With New York facing elimination, they sent David Wells to the mound. They struck first in the second off Jarrod Washburn on Robin Ventura's RBI double with runners on first and third, but the Angels tied the game in the second when Shawn Wooten scored from third on an error on David Eckstein's ground ball. The Yankees regained the lead in the fifth when Juan Rivera reached first on Third Basemen Troy Glaus's throwing error, moved to second on a double, and scored on Derek Jeter's sacrifice fly, but the Angels exploded for eight runs in the bottom of the inning. Shawn Wooten's lead-off home run tied the game, then Anaheim hit five consecutive singles with one out, the last three scoring a run each, to chase Wells. Ramiro Mendoza relieved Wells and allowed an RBI single to Wooten and a two-run double to Bengie Molina. Jorge Posada's lead-off home run in the sixth off Brendan Donnelly made it 9–3 Angels. Next inning, the Yankees loaded the bases with one out off Francisco Rodriguez but scored just once on a wild pitch. In the ninth, the Yankees hit three consecutive two-out singles, the last of which to Raul Mondesi scoring Bernie Williams before Nick Johnson popped out to end the game and series. Anaheim's victory secured their place in the American League Championship Series and ended the Yankees' bid for a fifth consecutive World Series appearance. It was the Yankees' first Division Series loss since the 1997 ALDS when they were defeated by the eventual American League Champion Cleveland Indians 3 games to 2.

Composite box
2002 ALDS (3–1): Anaheim Angels over New York Yankees

Oakland vs. Minnesota

Game 1
Network Associates Coliseum in Oakland, California

The A's struck first in the bottom of the first off Brad Radke when with runners on first and second on a walk and fielder's choice error, Eric Chavez drove in both with a single right. Chavez reached second on another error, then scored on David Justice's two-out single, all three runs unearned. The Twins cut the lead to 3–1 when Torii Hunter doubled to lead off the second off Tim Hudson and scored on Michael Cuddyer's one-out double. In the bottom of the inning, Ray Durham doubled with two outs, then scored on Scott Hatteberg's single. After another Twins error put runners on first and third, Chavez's single scored Hatteberg. In the third, the Twins cut the A's lead to 5–3 on Corey Koskie's two-run home run. Doug Mientkiewicz's leadoff home run in the sixth cut it to 5–4 A's. After Cuddyer grounded out, Ted Lilly relieved Hudson and allowed back-to-back singles to A. J. Pierzynski and Luis Rivas. Jacque Jones's RBI double then tied the game and after a walk, Koskie's RBI groundout put the Twins up 6–5. They added insurance in the seventh when Cuddyer singled with two outs off Cory Lidle and scored on Pierzynki's triple. The Minnesota bullpen pitched four innings of shutout ball to escape with a stunning 7–5 victory over the Athletics.

Game 2
Network Associates Coliseum in Oakland, California

Oakland dominated Twin starter Joe Mays from the get-go and never looked back. Third baseman Eric Chavez hit a three-run home run in the first inning, and the A's added five more runs in the fourth. Ray Durham was hit by a pitch with one out, then scored on Miguel Tejada's two-out double. After Chavez was intentionally walked, Mays was pulled from the game after  innings. After Tony Fiore walked Jermaine Dye to load the bases, David Justice cleared them with a triple before Justice scored on Mark Ellis's double. The A's added another run in the fifth when Durham doubled with one out, moved to third on a wild pitch, and scored on Scott Hatteberg's single. The Twins' lone run came on a Cristian Guzmán home run in the sixth inning as the series was tied 1–1 heading to Minnesota.

Game 3
Hubert H. Humphrey Metrodome in Minneapolis, Minnesota

Ray Durham stunned the Twin fans inside the Metrodome by leading off the game with an inside-the-park home run off Rick Reed, the first in Division Series history. Scott Hatteberg hit a home run to right field moments later to stake 23-game winner Barry Zito to a 2–0 lead. Terrence Long's home run in the fourth made it 3–0 A's. The Twins cut it to 3–1 on A. J. Pierzynski's RBI single with runners on first and third. Next inning, Jacque Jones drew a leadoff walk, then scored on Corey Koskie's one-out double. One out later, Koskie scored on Torii Hunter's single to tie the game, but in the sixth, Jermaine Dye's leadoff home run put the A's up 4–3 off Reed. Next inning, Johan Santana walked Durham with one out and Randy Velarde's pinch-hit double made it 5–3 A's. Verlade moved to third on the throw to home. Michael Jackson replaced Santana and allowed a sacrifice fly to Miguel Tejada to make it 6–3 A's. This was just the second postseason loss at the HHH Metrodome for the Twins (11–1 home record coming into the game), the last coming in 1991 to Toronto in the ALCS.

Game 4
Hubert H. Humphrey Metrodome in Minneapolis, Minnesota

The A's struck first on Miguel Tejada's two-run home run after a two-out walk off Eric Milton in the third, but in the bottom of the inning, the Twins tied the score on Cristian Guzman's RBI groundout with runners on second and third followed by David Ortiz's RBI double off Tim Hudson. Next inning, an error on Luis Rivas's ground ball with runners on first and second scored a run and put runners on second and third. A wild pitch scored another run before Jacque Jones was hit by a pitch. Another A's error on Cristian Guzman's ground ball scored another run and put runners on first and third. Ted Lilly in relief allowed an RBI single to Corey Koskie. After David Ortiz struck out, a wild pitch to Torii Hunter scored another run before Hunter's double and Doug Mientkiewicz's single scored a run each, all seven runs scored in this inning unearned. Mientkiewicz's two-run home run in the seventh after a lead off single off Lilly made it 11–2 Twins. and that was all starter Eric Milton needed, forcing a decisive Game 5 in Oakland.

Game 5
Network Associates Coliseum in Oakland, California

The Twins struck first in the second off Mark Mulder on Denny Hocking's based loaded two-out single. Next inning, Cristian Guzman hit a lead off double, then scored on Matt LeCroy's one-out single. Ray Durham's home run in the bottom of the inning off Brad Radke made it 2–1 Twins, which stayed that way until the ninth, when Dustan Mohr drew a leadoff walk off Billy Koch, then a home run from A. J. Pierzynski made it 4–1 Twins. Two outs later, Corey Koskie' singled, moved to second on a walk, and scored on an RBI double from David Ortiz. Oakland cut the lead to 5–4 off Twin closer Eddie Guardado in the bottom of the inning on Mark Ellis's three-run home run to left. Randy Velarde singled with two outs to represent the tying run when Ray Durham fouled out to second to end the series.

Minnesota's victory secured its place in the American League Championship Series. To date, this is the Twins most recent playoff series win.

Composite box
2002 ALDS (3–2): Minnesota Twins over Oakland Athletics

Notes

External links
ANA vs. NYY at Baseball-Reference
MIN vs. OAK at Baseball-Reference

American League Division Series
American League Division Series
Anaheim Angels postseason
Minnesota Twins postseason
New York Yankees postseason
Oakland Athletics postseason
American League Division Series
2000s in Oakland, California
American League Division Series
American League Division Series
21st century in Anaheim, California
2000s in Minneapolis
American League Division Series
2000s in the Bronx